Michael John Brougham, 5th Baron Brougham and Vaux,  (born 2 August 1938), is a British peer and a Member of the House of Lords.

Born the second son of the 4th Baron Brougham and Vaux, Brougham was educated at Millfield, Lycée Jaccard, Switzerland, and the Northampton Institute of Agriculture. On 20 July 1963, he married Olivia Susan Gray and they had one daughter, Henrietta Louise (born 23 February 1965). Succeeding to his father's title in 1967, he also divorced his wife that year and married Catherine Jill Gulliver. They have one son, Charles William Brougham (born 1971).

Lord Brougham has been deputy chairman of the Committees of the House of Lords, deputy speaker of the House of Lords since 1995 and is also currently vice-chairman of the Association of Conservative Peers. He was president of the Royal Society for the Prevention of Accidents from 1986 to 1989 (and has been vice-president since 1990), and has been president of Safety Groups UK since it replaced the National Health and Safety Groups Council, in 2005. He has also been chairman of the Tax Payers' Society from 1989 to 1991 and has been chairman of the European Secure Vehicle Alliance since 1992. In 1995, he was appointed CBE.

Arms

Notes

References

Sources
Burke's Peerage and Gentry
 House of Lords biography
 Hansard
Entry at The Peerage

1938 births
Living people
5
Younger sons of barons
Commanders of the Order of the British Empire
Conservative Party (UK) hereditary peers
People educated at Millfield

Hereditary peers elected under the House of Lords Act 1999